The Swedish Cycling Federation  or SCF (in Swedish: Svenska Cykelförbundet) was established in 1900, and is the national governing body of cycle racing in Sweden.

The SCF is a member of the UCI and the UEC.

External links
 Swedish Cycling Federation official website

National members of the European Cycling Union
Cycle racing organizations
Cycling
Cycle racing in Sweden
Sports organizations established in 1900
1900 establishments in Sweden